Mount Cyril is an ice-covered mountain,  high, standing  south of Celebration Pass in the Commonwealth Range. It was discovered and named by the British Antarctic Expedition, 1907–09, under Shackleton, and named for Cyril Longhurst, Secretary of the British National Antarctic Expedition, 1901–04, who was best man at Shackleton's wedding.

References 

Mountains of the Ross Dependency
Dufek Coast